The main managing agency responsible for science and technology (S&T) in Vietnam is the Ministry of Science and Technology (MOST). MOST's responsibilities include scientific research, technology development and innovation activities; development of science and technology potentials; intellectual property; standards, metrology and quality control; atomic energy, radiation and nuclear safety; and state management on public services in fields under the Ministry’s management as stipulated by law.

Background

The origins of science and technology and Vietnam can be traced back to as early as 20,000 BC to the Sơn Vi culture, a late Paleolithic Age in Vietnam characterized by stone tools. Pebble tools similar to ones found around the world dating to this period have been found by archeologists in the Son La and Phu Tho provinces. Following the Stone Age, the Dong Sun Bronze Age culture dating from 1,000 BC-100 AD came about in the Red River Valley region of northern Vietnam. Dong Son culture is characterized by rice cultivation techniques, domestication of water buffalo and pigs, fishing and sailing via dugout canoe, and most notably expert bronze casting in the form of distinctive Dong Son drum decorated with geometric patterns, scenes of war, animals, and boats.

Following the Dong Son period, Vietnam came into an extended period of conflict with China beginning with the Baiyue-Qin War. Via contact, many other Han discoveries that were translated into Chinese (negative numbers in math, seismometers, advancements in metallurgy, junk ships, and wheelbarrows to name just a few) made their way south to Vietnam. Vietnamese medical discoveries employed native ingredients that had incorporated practices from Chinese traditional medicine.

Vietnam also created an imperial examination system which produced a scholar-bureaucrat class of scientific researchers and publications. In the Battle of Bạch Đằng in 981 when Ngô Quyền developed a technique of sinking intruding Chinese navy fleets. The same original technique of sinking naval fleets developed by Ngô Quyền was later employed by Vietnamese generals to repel the Mongol invasions of Vietnam, an empire that would later go on to rule much of China, Russia, Europe and the Arab world. In the 15th century Vietnamese scholar Hồ Nguyên Trừng was known for his innovations on firearms and cannons  and helped transfer knowledge of Vietnamese firearm technology once living in exile in China. Firearm and cannon technology developed by the Vietnamese would prove vital to the conquest of Champa by the Đại Việt in the Cham-Vietnamese War of 1471 and overall Vietnamese matchlocks during this period were considered world-class not only with Ming China but also European observers of the Trịnh–Nguyễn civil war. By the 1800s, Nguyễn rulers such as Emperor Minh Mạng claimed the legacy of Confucianism and China's Han dynasty for Vietnam in relation to its neighbouring states.

In more recent history, Vietnamese (both domestic scientists and Overseas Vietnamese) inventors and scientists have produced several great discoveries. Đàm Thanh Sơn, a theoretical physicist, Eugene H. Trinh, and Bui Tuong Phong, the creator of the Phong reflection model, are three examples of Vietnamese Americans having done great scientific work. Hung Nguyen Xuan, Đái Duy Ban, Hoàng Tụy (known for the Tụy cut in global optimization) are three examples of notable scientists in Vietnam. Ngô Bảo Châu, a citizen of Vietnam and France, was awarded a Fields Medal for his work in the mathematical theory of automorphic forms. Đỗ Đức Cường is also credited as the co-inventor of the ATM along with John Shepherd-Barron & Donald Wetzel. AXIE Infinity was a 2018 NFT-based video game by Sky Mavis (co-created by Nguyễn Thành Trung), which had started to become immensely popular by 2021.

Socio-economic context

Structure of the economy
Vietnam has become increasingly integrated into the world economy, particularly since its efforts to liberalize the economy enabled it to join the World Trade Organization in 2007. The manufacturing and service sectors each account for 40% of GDP. However, almost half the labor force (48%) is still employed in agriculture. One million workers a year, out of a total of 51.3 million in 2010, are projected to continue leaving agriculture for the other economic sectors in the foreseeable future.

In manufacturing, Vietnam is expected to lose some of its current comparative advantage in low wages in the near future. It will need to compensate for this loss with productivity gains, if it is to sustain high growth rates: GDP per capita has almost doubled since 2008. High-tech exports from Vietnam grew dramatically during 2008–2013, particularly with respect to office computers and electronic communications equipment. A big challenge will be to implement strategies that increase the potential for enhancing technology and skills currently present in large multinational firms to smaller-scale domestic firms. This will require strategies to enhance technical capacity and skills among local firms that are, as yet, only weakly integrated with global production chains.

Many foreign multinational firms have gravitated towards Vietnam in recent years but the number of patents nevertheless remains low: 47 were granted between 2002 and 2013. Even though 11% of Southeast Asia's high-tech exports came from Vietnam in 2013 (excluding the Republic of Korea and Japan), according to the Comtrade database, the majority of high-tech exports from Vietnam were designed elsewhere and assembled in Vietnam. Even if foreign firms change their behavior and intensify their in-house R&D, this will  only boost R&D in Vietnam if the multinationals can train a sufficient number of local personnel and work with skilled local suppliers and firms.

Higher education
Since 1995, enrolment in higher education has grown tenfold to well over 2 million in 2012. By 2014, there were 419 institutions of higher education. A number of foreign universities operate private campuses in Vietnam, including Harvard University (USA) and the Royal Melbourne Institute of Technology (Australia).

The government’s strong commitment to education (6.3% of GDP in 2012), in general, and higher education, in particular (1.05% of GDP in 2012), has fostered significant growth in higher education but this growth will need to be sustained to retain academics. The Law on Higher Education (2012) gives university administrators greater autonomy, although the Ministry of Education retains responsibility for quality assurance.

Science, technology and innovation

Institutional context
There are a large number of universities and an even larger pool of research institutions in Vietnam. This poses a challenge for ministries in terms of co-ordination. To some extent, market forces are likely to eliminate the smaller and financially weaker units.

The autonomy which Vietnamese research centres have enjoyed since the mid-1990s has enabled many of them to operate as quasi-private organizations, providing services such as consulting and technology development. Some have ‘spun off’ from the larger institutions to form their own semi-private enterprises, fostering the transfer of public sector personnel employed in science and technology to these semi-private establishments. One comparatively new university, Ton Duc Thang (est. 1997), has already set up 13 centres for technology transfer and services that together produce 15% of university revenue. Many of these research centres serve as valuable intermediaries bridging public research institutions, universities and firms.
60% of the population in Vietnam is below 30 years old and more than 25000 eligible engineers graduate from college every year.

Policy developments 
The Law on Higher Education (2012) offers university administrators greater autonomy and there are reports that growing numbers of academic staff are also serving as advisors to NGOs and private firms. The Strategy for Science and Technology Development for 2011–2020 drawn up by the Ministry of Science and Technology in 2012, builds upon this law by promoting public–private partnerships and seeking to transform ‘public S&T organisations into self-managed and accountable mechanisms as stipulated by law’. The main emphasis is on overall planning and priority-setting, with a view to enhancing innovation capability, particularly in industrial sectors. Although the Strategy omits to fix any targets for funding, it nevertheless sets broad policy directions and priority areas for investment, including:
 research in mathematics and physics;
 investigation of climate change and natural disasters;
 development of operating systems for computers, tablets and mobile devices;
 biotechnology applied particularly to agriculture, forestry, fisheries and medicine; and
 environmental protection.
The Strategy foresees the development of a network of organizations to support consultancy services in the field of innovation and the development of intellectual property. The Strategy also seeks to promote greater international scientific co-operation, with a plan to establish a network of Vietnamese scientists overseas and to initiate a network of ‘outstanding research centres’ linking key national science institutions with partners abroad.

Vietnam has also developed a set of national development strategies for selected sectors of the economy, many of which involve science and technology. Examples are the Sustainable Development Strategy (April 2012) and the Mechanical Engineering Industry Development Strategy (2006), together with Vision 2020 (2006). These dual strategies call for a highly skilled human resource base, a strong policy for investment in research and development, fiscal policies to encourage technological upgrading in the private sector and private-sector investment and regulations to steer investment towards sustainable development.

Research trends
In 2011, domestic research expenditure amounted to 0.19% of GDP, one of the lowest ratios in Southeast Asia. Women accounted for 41% of the country's researchers in 2012, one of the highest ratios in Southeast Asia. Vietnam was ranked 44th in the Global Innovation Index in 2021, it has increased its ranking considerably since 2012, where it was ranked 76th. 

The number of Vietnamese publications in Thomson Reuters' Web of Science has increased at a rate well above the average for Southeast Asia but from a low starting point: Vietnamese scientists had 570 articles catalogued in international journals in 2005 and 2 298 in 2014. By 2014, Vietnam had a modest scientific publication density of 25 publications per million inhabitants. This places Vietnam behind Thailand (94), Vanuatu (74) and the Solomon Islands (30) but ahead of the Lao Peoples' Democratic Republic (19). Vietnamese publications catalogued in international journals focus mainly on life sciences (22%), physics (13%) and engineering (13%), which is consistent with recent advances in the production of diagnostic equipment and shipbuilding. Almost 77% of all papers published between 2008 and 2014 by Vietnamese scientists had at least one international scientist in collaboration.

See also
Ministry of Science and Technology (Vietnam)
Ministry of Health (Vietnam)
Vietnam Union of Science and Technology Associations
Vietnam Academy of Science and Technology
Ho Chi Minh City University of Science
Hanoi University of Science and Technology
List of Vietnamese inventions and discoveries

Sources

References

 
Economy of Vietnam
Education in Vietnam